The Alstom Coradia Juniper series is a family of electric multiple unit trains built by Alstom Transport Birmingham for use on the railway network in Great Britain. The family is related to the Coradia 1000 series of diesel multiple units.

There are currently two types in service with various TOCs, with a total of 76 units in service (36 class 458s and 40 class 334s). All Class 460s are now converted to Class 458/5s for South Western Railway.

Variants

Class 334 

The Class 334 is an EMU in service with ScotRail on the suburban network around Glasgow, mainly operating services  from Edinburgh Waverley via Airdrie and Bathgate on the North Clyde Line and some services on the Argyle Line. Class 334 trains are powered using  overhead wires. A total of 40 three car units are in use (numbered 001–040), of which 38 were delivered starting in 1999, although due to teething problems, they did not enter service until 2001. The technical issues resulted in 2 extra units being delivered as compensation.

Class 458 

The Class 458 (also known as 4JOP) is operated by South Western Railway on services from London Waterloo to Reading, Weybridge, Windsor & Eton Riverside, and circular metro routes from Waterloo via Richmond and Hounslow. As with all electrically powered trains on the former Southern Region, the Class 458 units are powered using . Initially, a total of thirty 4-car units were built, with deliveries beginning in 1998, with the full complement in service by 2004. However, they suffered from leaky roofs and failing electronics and were therefore stored from 2004 to late 2005, being replaced by more Class 450 units on the routes they operated. For a brief period, they were subleased to Gatwick Express, but were never used on Gatwick Express Services.

In 2013, former operator South West Trains and Porterbrook began the process of creating a new, 36-strong fleet of 5-car trains by reforming and partially rebuilding the vehicles from the Class 458 and Class 460 fleets; by creating 30 units utilising the original Class 458/0 vehicles, with an extra ex-Class 460 vehicle per unit to create 5-car units, and an additional 6 new 5-car units created entirely from ex-Class 460 stock. The new units have been renumbered as the Class 458/5. They entered service in March 2014. Work included complete reconstruction of cabs and gangways, as well as changes to the passenger areas. The units are  painted into the same livery as the Class 450 units (they previously were painted in the South West Trains Express livery carried by the Class 444, 158 and 159 units). This process was completed in 2016. The original 30 ex-Class 458/0 units are numbered 458501–458530, and are distinguishable from the ex-Class 460 stock (458531-458536) by noting the different ribbon-glazed windows on ex-Class 460 units, different door window sizes and the lack of a pantograph recess on ex-Class 460 units. This means that if future conversion to OHLE is required for this fleet, the process will be much simpler on 458501-458530 than 458531–458536.

All units are now in South Western Railway - branded South West Trains livery, and were due to be replaced on all South Western Railway routes by new Class 701 units from 2019 to 2020. During March 2021 SWR cancelled the withdrawal plans of their 458s and instead returned their Class 442s to their lessor. SWR cited that 458s would be their replacement

Class 460 

The Class 460 electric multiple units (also known as 8GAT) were originally built for use on the dedicated Gatwick Express airport service to London Victoria. The units were delivered between 2000 and 2001 and like the similar Class 458 they were powered using . The fleet consisted of 8 units in total numbered 460001–008, each formed of 8 vehicles (driving motor luggage van, two intermediate 1st-class/composite trailers, two intermediate 2nd-class motor carriages, an intermediate 2nd-class trailer, another 2nd-class motor carriage, and a 2nd-class driving motor).

Following their removal from the Gatwick Express franchise in September 2012 a decision was made to reform and merge the Class 460s with the Class 458 vehicles in order to form 36 x 5-car trains to boost capacity on the South West Trains network. The first two of the 5-car sets were delivered in October 2013. Passenger service had started in March 2014.

References 

 
British Rail electric multiple units
Train-related introductions in 2000